Minuscule 447 (in the Gregory-Aland numbering), ε 507 (in the Soden numbering), is a Greek minuscule manuscript of the New Testament, on parchment. Palaeographically it has been assigned to the 15th century.

Description 
The codex contains a complete text of the four Gospels on 329 parchment leaves. It is written in one column per page, in 25 lines per page. Three paper fly-leaves were added in modern time. The headpieces are decorated in red and black ink, or black and brown ink. The initial letters in red.

There is also a division according to the smaller Ammonian Sections (in Mark 240, 16:9), with references to the Eusebian Canons (written below Ammonian Section numbers).

It is well written.

Text 

The Greek text of the codex is a representative of the Byzantine text-type. Hermann von Soden classified it to the textual family Kx. Aland did  not place it in any Category. According to the Claremont Profile Method it represents textual family Family Kx in Luke 1 and M27 in Luke 10 and Luke 20. It is close to 1014 in Luke 10 and Luke 20.

History 
The manuscript was written by Gerardos, a scribe. John Gibson, a dealer, sold it to Edward Harley on 13 February 1723/1724. In 1753 it was purchased along with other manuscripts of collection by the British Museum.

The manuscript was added to the list of New Testament manuscripts by Scholz (1794-1852). Scholz examined only Mark 5. C. R. Gregory saw it in 1883. The manuscript was rebound in 1965.

It is currently housed at the British Library (Harley MS 5784).

See also 

 List of New Testament minuscules
 Biblical manuscript
 Textual criticism

References

Further reading 

 Cyril Ernest Wright, Fontes Harleiani: A Study of the Sources of the Harleian Collection of Manuscripts in the British Museum (London: British Museum, 1972), p. 162. 
 Repertorium der griechischen Kopisten 800-1600, ed. by Ernst Gamillscheg and Dieter Harlfinger, Veröffentlichungen der Kommission für Byzantinistik, 3-1, ed. by Herbert Hunger (Vienna: Österreichischen Akademie der Wissenschaften, 1981- ), I: Handschriften aus Bibliotheken Grossbritanniens, 3 vols, no. 80.  
 Summary Catalogue of Greek Manuscripts (London: British Library, 1999- ), I, p. 191.

External links 
 Harleian 5784 at the British Library

Greek New Testament minuscules
15th-century biblical manuscripts
Harleian Collection